Stendhal Festival was originally formed in 2008 by Ross Parkhill & John Cartwright, to showcase local music across 3 days in Limavady, Northern Ireland. Bands such as And So I Watch You From Afar, Two Door Cinema Club, Delerentos, The Coronas, Jape and Get Cape.Wear Cape.Fly. were due to perform, but the event was cancelled due to poor ticket sales.

The festival reformed as Stendhal Festival of Art in 2011  by the founders Ross Parkhill, John Cartwright and Colm O'Donnell, as a platform for local artists to perform alongside acts such as Turin Brakes at Ballymully Cottage Farm in Limavady. The festival was named after Stendhal Syndrome.

Attendance numbers of the festival have increased year on year, with the festival winning Best Small Festival in 2013–2015, Best Family Friendly Festival 2014 in Ireland and nominated  for the UK Festival Awards in 2016. The festival is built  and run by volunteers from the local area.

References

External links 
 https://www.stendhalfestival.com/

Music festivals in Ireland